Stevan Stošić (Serbian Cyrillic: Стеван Cтoшић; born 9 August 1984) is a Serbian retired footballer who played as a midfielder.

Football career
Born in Kruševac, Socialist Federative Republic of Yugoslavia, Stošić started playing for local FK Napredak Kruševac in the second division. His top flight debuts were made in the 2005–06 season, with OFK Beograd.

In August 2006, Stošić moved to Spain and signed with Málaga CF in the second level. Scarcely used, he would be loaned in the 2007–08 campaign to another team in the country and category, Racing de Ferrol. However, in March 2008, without having made any league appearances, he was released by the Galicians.

Returning to Málaga in July 2008, Stošić found himself surplus to requirements but, unable to find a new club, remained for 2008–09. He was finally released in early April 2009, after failing to turn up for training with the B-side.

After more than one year out of competitive football, Stošić signed with Montenegro's FK Mogren. He subsequently returned to his country, first with former team Napredak then FK Novi Pazar.

References

External links
Srbijafudbal profile 

1984 births
Living people
Sportspeople from Kruševac
Serbian footballers
Association football midfielders
Serbian SuperLiga players
FK Napredak Kruševac players
OFK Beograd players
FK Novi Pazar players
Segunda División players
Málaga CF players
Racing de Ferrol footballers
FK Mogren players
Serbian expatriate footballers
Expatriate footballers in Spain
Expatriate footballers in Montenegro
Serbian expatriate sportspeople in Spain